The Peugeot Type 9 was a particular model of early automobile manufactured by the French company Automobiles Peugeot between 1894 and 1897, during which time 87 examples were built. It was equipped with a 1.2 liter v-twin engine made in conjunction with Daimler, one of 257 such vehicles produced. The Type 9 was advertised as the brand's first closed-top family car. Like most European vehicles from this time period, it had very small dimensions and mirrored the design style of horse carriages. A 1894 Type 9 chassis was the first ever vehicle in the world to be equipped with pneumatic tires(by Michelin). It was called L'Éclair and participated in the 1895 Paris-Bordeaux-Paris race.

For 1897, production of the Type 9 along with that of all other Peugeot models was transferred to the company's first dedicated automobile factory in Audincourt.

See also 

 Peugeot
 List of Peugeot vehicles

References 

Peugeot vehicles
Vehicles introduced in 1894
1890s cars